British indie rock band called alt-J have released four studio albums, one live album, three extended plays, fourteen singles, and thirteen music videos.

Albums

Studio albums

Live albums

Remix albums

Extended plays

Singles

Other charted songs

Other appearances

Music videos

Notes

References

External links
 Official website
 
 
 

Discography
Discographies of British artists
Alternative rock discographies
Rock music group discographies